The Accused is a 1949 American film noir drama film directed by William Dieterle and written by Ketti Frings, based on Be Still, My Love, a 1947 novel written by June Truesdell.  The film stars Loretta Young and Robert Cummings.

Plot
Wilma Tuttle (Young) is a college professor who becomes the target of sexual interest from her student Bill Perry (Douglas Dick). When Perry tries to rape Tuttle, she beats him to death with an auto part, unintentionally, in a terrified effort at self defense. She covers up her crime by making it seem as though Perry was killed while diving into the sea from a precipitous cliff. As she follows the police investigation into Perry's death, Wilma realizes that she'll never be able to escape her conscience, especially when she falls in love with Warren Ford (Cummings), the dead boy's guardian.

Cast

 Loretta Young as Dr. Wilma Tuttle
 Robert Cummings as Warren Ford
 Wendell Corey as Lt. Ted Dorgan
 Sam Jaffe as Dr. Romley
 Douglas Dick as Bill Perry
 Suzanne Dalbert as Susan Duval
 Sara Allgood as Mrs. Conner
 Mickey Knox as Jack Hunter
 George Spaulding as Dean Rhodes
 Francis Pierlot as Dr. Vinson
 Ann Doran as Miss Rice, Nurse
 Carole Mathews as Waitress
 Billy Mauch as Harry Brice
 Henry Travers as Blakely - Romley's Assistant (uncredited)

Production

Development
In June 1946 Hal Wallis bought the film rights to an unpublished novel by June Trusedell, Be Still, My Love, for a reported price of $75,000. The film was to be a vehicle for Barbara Stanwyck and would be made at Paramount, where Wallis had based himself. In December, Wallis said filming would start in January. It would be the first on Wallis' slate for 1947 with an overall budget of $8,500,000. Filming was pushed back. In March, Wallis said Don deFore would co-star with Stanwyck.

By February 1947 Ginger Rogers had become a star and Wallis was not going to make the film until he had finished shooting a movie in England. In March, Wallis said the stars would be Stanwyck and Wendell Corey and he would hold off filming until Corey returned from England where he was appearing on stage in Voice of the Turtle.

In November 1947 Hedda Hopper reported that Stanwyck dropped out of the film because "the script was too stupid to shoot". Wallis put her in Sorry, Wrong Number (1948) instead; the only other script he had ready to go. That month Ketti Frings was reported as working on the script.

In January 1948 Kirk Douglas, then under contract to Wallis, was linked to the project.

Loretta Young
In February Wallis announced that Loretta Young would play the lead and the film would be called Strange Deception. Young won an Oscar for The Farmer's Daughter after she had been signed to do the movie.

The other lead roles went to Robert Cummings and Wendell Corey, both of whom were under contract to Wallis. Young says that shortly before filming, Wallis approached her suggesting that the two actors swap roles, with Cummings to play the detective and Corey the male lead. Young said: "I knew he wanted to switch because he had just put Wendell Corey under contract, and Robert Cummings was being eased out." Young said it was up to Wallis but felt Corey was not a leading man. "He was a very attractive second lead. Bob Cummings at one time was a leading man."

Eventually the roles stayed as they were. Young said that possibly Wallis was right.

It was the eleventh film from Wallis since he set up his own production unit. Filming started April 1948.

Young later said she "loved" the film and the script, saying Frings "was a wonderful writer... she knew and liked women... she also knew their stupid little frailties... a very good story." She says Wallis "bent over backwards trying to do everything nice all during the picture."

Reception
The New York Times gave the film a positive review: "Murder is a common and salable screen commodity...The Accused, ...is a super-duper psychological job, well spiced with terminology which sounds impressive, if not always crystal clear in meaning, and the performers go about their business with an earnestness which commands attention. Under William Dieterle's assured direction, the story flows smoothly and methodically builds up suspense to a punchy climax which leaves it to the audience to determine whether the defendant should be punished or go free."

Variety magazine also praised it: "The Accused exploits fear and emotional violence into a high grade melodrama...Director William Dieterle, with a solid story foundation and an ace cast upon which to build, marches the melodrama along with a touch that keeps punching continually at audience emotions...Loretta Young's portrayal of the distraught professor plays strongly for sympathy. It's an intelligent delineation, gifting the role with life. She gets under the skin in bringing out the mental processes of an intelligent woman who knows she has done wrong but believes that her trail is so covered that murder will never out."

References

Notes

External links
 
 
 
 
The Accused at Letterbox DVD
The Accused at BFI

1949 films
1949 crime drama films
American crime drama films
American black-and-white films
1940s English-language films
Film noir
Films scored by Victor Young
Films based on American novels
Films directed by William Dieterle
Films produced by Hal B. Wallis
Paramount Pictures films
1940s American films